Byron Wayne Fowler (born January 23, 1948) is a former American football offensive lineman who played for the Buffalo Bills. He also signed with the Green Bay Packers but did not play in any games for them.

References

1948 births
Living people
Buffalo Bills players
American football offensive linemen
Richmond Spiders football players
Players of American football from Baltimore